Stephanus Botha (30 March 1931 – 2017) was a South African water polo player. He competed in the men's tournament at the 1960 Summer Olympics.

References

External links
 

1931 births
2017 deaths
South African male water polo players
Olympic water polo players of South Africa
Water polo players at the 1960 Summer Olympics
People from Stellenbosch
Sportspeople from the Western Cape